Glenn Medeiros is the second self-titled album, third altogether, by American singer Glenn Medeiros, released in 1990. It includes the US Billboard Hot 100 number one single "She Ain't Worth It", featuring Bobby Brown.

Track listing

Charts

References

External links
Glenn Medeiros at Discogs

1990 albums
Glenn Medeiros albums
MCA Records albums
Mercury Records albums
Albums produced by Ray Parker Jr.